Mayoyao, officially the Municipality of Mayoyao  is a 4th class municipality in the province of Ifugao, Philippines. According to the 2020 census, it has a population of 15,621 people.

History

Battle of Mayoyao Ridge
From July 26, to August 9, 1945, Filipino soldiers under the command of Donald Blackburn, supported by airstrikes by Army Air Forces, captured the Japanese stronghold of Mayoyao, Ifugao in Northern Luzon.

The memorial or historical marker, located at Mount Nagchajan in Mayoyao, Ifugao, marks the site of the “Battle of Mayoyao Ridge”. The battle was fought between the Japanese Imperial forces and the combined Filipino and American soldiers, towards the end of World War II. The result was key to the eventual surrender of General Yamashita at Kiangan, Ifugao.

Geography

Barangays
Mayoyao is politically subdivided into 27 barangays. These barangays are headed by elected officials: Barangay Captain, Barangay Council, whose members are called Barangay Councilors. All are elected every three years.

Climate

Demographics

Economy

Government
Mayoyao, belonging to the lone congressional district of the province of Ifugao, is governed by a mayor designated as its local chief executive and by a municipal council as its legislative body in accordance with the Local Government Code. The mayor, vice mayor, and the councilors are elected directly by the people through an election which is being held every three years.

Elected officials

References

External links
 [ Philippine Standard Geographic Code]
Philippine Census Information
Local Governance Performance Management System

Municipalities of Ifugao